Bernardo Loera Carrillo (born 20 August 1971) is a Mexican politician affiliated with the National Action Party. As of 2014 he served as Deputy of the LIX Legislature of the Mexican Congress as a plurinominal representative.

References

1971 births
Living people
Politicians from Durango
Members of the Chamber of Deputies (Mexico)
National Action Party (Mexico) politicians
21st-century Mexican politicians
Deputies of the LIX Legislature of Mexico